State Route 208 (SR 208) is a , west–east route that serves as a connector between SR 165 and the bridge across the Chattahoochee River at Cottonton, the only bridge across the river between Phenix City and Eufaula. From its western terminus, the route continues east into Georgia as Georgia State Route 39 Spur (SR 39 Spur).

Route description
SR 208 begins at an intersection with SR 165 in Cottonton, heading southeast on two-lane undivided Omaha Road through woodland. The route comes to a bridge over the  Chattahoochee River, where it continues into Georgia as SR 39 Spur.

Major intersections

See also

References

External links

208
Transportation in Russell County, Alabama
State highways in the United States shorter than one mile